Bimbo Tjihero (born 1 December 1969) is a retired Namibian footballer. He competed for the Namibia national team from 1997 to 1998, including the 1998 African Cup of Nations. He played for Liverpool Okahandja. He played as a defender.

References

Namibia Premier League players
Namibia international footballers
1998 African Cup of Nations players
1969 births
Living people

Association football defenders
Namibian men's footballers